Wedu Reneilwe Batlokwa (born 1 December 1997) is a Botswana professional footballer who plays as a midfielder.

Early and personal life
Batlokwa attended Gable Hall School. As of October 2018 he was fluent in three languages and learning a fourth.

Club career
Batlokwa began his career with Thurrock, joining Southend United at the age of 14. He moved on loan to Lowestoft Town in April 2018. He played with the Southend first team during the 2018–19 pre-season, making his competitive debut on 4 September 2018.

He was released by Southend at the end of the 2018–19 season. Batlokwa then joined Brentwood Town at the end of November 2019. He played for the club until March 2020, where he joined Canvey Island. He was released in the summer 2020.

International career
He made his debut for the Botswana national football team on 14 October 2019 in a friendly against Egypt.

References

External links
 

1997 births
Living people
Botswana footballers
Botswana international footballers
Southend United F.C. players
Lowestoft Town F.C. players
Brentwood Town F.C. players
Canvey Island F.C. players
Association football midfielders
Botswana expatriate footballers
Botswana expatriate sportspeople in England
Expatriate footballers in England
Thurrock F.C. players